Sivert is a Scandinavian male name, a variant of Sigvard and Siward. It may refer to:

Sivert Høyem (born 1976), Norwegian singer
Sivert Langholm (1927–2022), Norwegian historian
Sivert Mattsson (1907–1999), Swedish cross country skier 
Sivert Andreas Nielsen (1916–2004), Norwegian civil servant, banker and politician
Sivert Andreas Nielsen (1823–1904), Norwegian politician for the Liberal Party
Sivert Samuelson (1883–1958), South African cricketer
Sivert Christensen Strøm (1819–1902), Norwegian jurist and politician
Sivert Todal (1904–1988), Norwegian politician

See also 
Sievert (name)
Sigurd

Scandinavian masculine given names
Norwegian masculine given names